The 2009 BCR Open Romania was a men's tennis tournament played on outdoor clay courts. It was the 17th edition of the event known that year as the BCR Open Romania, and was part of the ATP World Tour 250 series of the 2009 ATP World Tour. It was held at the Arenele BNR in Bucharest, Romania, from 21 September through 27 September 2009.

Entrants

Seeds

 1 Rankings are based on the rankings of September 14, 2009

Other entrants
The following players received wildcards into the singles main draw

  Petru-Alexandru Luncanu
  Andrei Pavel
  Marius Copil

The following players received entry from the qualifying draw:

  Pere Riba
  Júlio Silva
  Santiago Ventura
  Filippo Volandri

Finals

Singles

 Albert Montañés defeated  Juan Mónaco, 7–6(7–2), 7–6(8–6)
 It was Montañés' 2nd title of the year, and the 3rd of his career.

Doubles

 František Čermák /  Michal Mertiňák defeated  Johan Brunström /  Jean-Julien Rojer, 6–2, 6–4

External links

Official website

BCR Open Romania
Romanian Open
BCR Open Romania
BCR Open Romania